The Institute is a 2022 American thriller film directed by Hamza Zaman and starring Ignacyo Matynia and Victorya Brandart.  It is Zaman's feature directorial debut.

Cast
Ignacyo Matynia as Daniel Sullivan
Victorya Brandart as Marie Sullivan
Mark Lobene as Dr. Arthur Lands
Joy Donze as Blu Foster
Claire McClain as  Izzy Alibrahim
Louisa Bradshaw as Mel Williams
Jarred Harper as Steve Williams
John Easterlin as Dr. Kramer

Release
In March 2022, it was announced that Gravitas Ventures and Kamikaze Dogfright acquired North American distribution rights to the film, which was released on March 22, 2022.

Reception
Cody Hamman of JoBlo.com gave the film a negative review, writing that it "doesn’t quite work as a whole."

Evan Dossey of the Midwest Film Journal also gave the film a negative review and wrote, "The problem is that this film completely lacks a psychological thriller aspect, and Marie isn’t really written with the internal life to carry such a story."

References

External links
 
 

2022 films
2022 thriller films
American thriller films
2020s English-language films
2020s American films